The China women's cricket team toured South Korea in November 2018 to play a three-match Women's Twenty20 International (WT20I) series. These were the first matches with WT20I status to be played by either side after the International Cricket Council announced that all matches played between women's teams of Associate Members after 1 July 2018 would have full T20I status. The venue for all of the matches was the Yeonhui Cricket Ground in Incheon. China won the series 2–1.

WT20I series

1st WT20I

2nd WT20I

3rd WT20I

References

External links
 Series home at ESPN Cricinfo

International cricket competitions in 2018–19